Winter Wonderland is the tenth solo studio album by the English singer-songwriter Paul Carrack, and his first after leaving the supergroup Mike + The Mechanics. It was originally released in 2005 on Carrack's own Carrack-UK label.

This was Carrack's first holiday-themed album, and was recorded in collaboration with the SWR Big Band. The songs are mostly familiar Christmas/winter-themed classics; Carrack covers his own "Beautiful World" as the album's final track.

The album was issued in Europe as A Soulful Christmas, with an altered running order and four additional tracks.

Track listing

A Soulful Christmas track listing

This album was released in Europe with a revised track listing as A Soulful Christmas.  This version of the album features 4 additional tracks:  "I'll Be Home for Christmas", "I Say A Little Prayer", and 2 duet versions of "Silent Night",

Personnel
 Paul Carrack – vocals
 Lindsay Dracass – vocals (3)
 Stefan Gwildis – vocals (15)
 Chris Walden – conductor, arrangements (1-4, 6, 7, 9, 12, 15)
 Steve Sidwell – arrangements (5, 14)
 Dieter Reith – arrangements (8, 11, 13)
 Conny Schock – arrangements (10)
 Klaus-Peter Schöpfer – arrangements (10)

SWR Big Band
 Conny Schock – keyboards 
 Klaus Wagenleiter – keyboards, acoustic piano 
 Dieter Reith – organ
 Klaus-Peter Schöpfer – guitars 
 Decebal Badila – bass 
 Guido Jöris and Thomas Simmerl – drums 
 Jörg Gebhardt – percussion 
 Klaus Graf, Jörg Kaufmann, Axel Kühn, Andreas Maile and Pierre Paquette – saxophones, woodwinds 
 Ian Cumming, Marc Godfroid, Ernst Hutter and Georg Maus – trombone 
 Felice Civitareale, Karl Farrent, Claus Reichstaller and Rudi Reindl – trumpet, flugelhorn

Production
 Chris Walden – producer
 Klaus-Peter Schöpfer – additional producer, mixing 
 Ulrich de Veer – executive producer 
 Karl Farrent – executive producer 
 Rudi Reindl – executive producer 
 Volker Neumann – recording engineer 
 Manfred Deppe – recording supervisor 
 Tanja Hiesch – recording assistant 
 Jürgen Koppers – mastering 
 Felix Gaubatz – editorial contributor
 Michael Golla – A&R consultant 
 WAPS (Hamburg, Germany) – design 
 Marcus Weber – photography 
 Hans-Peter Zachary – album concept, liner notes

References

External links

2005 Christmas albums
Paul Carrack albums
Covers albums